John Reinhard Goodman (died July 8, 1865)  was an Episcopal clergyman who served as Chaplain of the Senate (1836–1837).

Early life 

Goodman was born in Philadelphia.  He graduated from the University of Pennsylvania (Bachelor of Arts, 1813, Master of Arts 1817).

Ministry 

John R. Goodman became pastor of the Episcopal congregation in Brunswick, New York in April 1821 and continued there until 1828.  He then served as rector of Christ Church, New Bern, North Carolina, from 1828 to 1834   Thereafter, until 1837, he was rector of St. John's Church, Carlisle, Pennsylvania.  He served as Chaplain of the Senate (1836–1837).  In later years he lived in Philadelphia and remained active in denominational gatherings up until the year of his death.  He died in Philadelphia on July 8, 1865.

He was the author of ‘’Pennsylvania Biography, or Memoirs of Eminent Pennsylvanians’’ (1840).

Personal life 

Goodman married Julia W (Woodbridge) Rodman,  They had three children: Catherine Goodman, Charlotte Goodman and Julia M. Goodman, who married. Byron Pomeroy.

References 
 

Chaplains of the United States Senate
1865 deaths
People from New Bern, North Carolina
Year of birth unknown